On n'est pas couché was a French talk show broadcast on France 2 on Saturdays at 11 p.m. and hosted by Laurent Ruquier. It was produced by Ruquier and Catherine Barma. It first aired on 16 September 2006; after fourteen seasons, it ended on the 4 July 2020. Ruquier was assisted by two columnists: notable personalities have starred on the show, including Éric Zemmour, Éric Naulleau, Natacha Polony and Yann Moix. Secondary columnists were also sometimes present, including humourists Jonathan Lambert and Nicolas Bedos.

Content
The show ran for about 190 minutes with no publicity breaks. Ruquier started by a monologue that lasted for about 20 minutes; he presented the past week's news with humour. He also presented some of the week's best cartoons before turning to his columnists for comments. The five guests (mainly actors, singers, writers) then talked about their projects and interacted with the columnists. A personality (often a politician, philosopher, union leader) was then interviewed by Ruquier and his columnists for about an hour.

Columnists

References

French television talk shows
France 2
2006 French television series debuts
2018 French television series endings